Don't Look Back was a yearly series of concerts in which London-based promoters All Tomorrow's Parties would ask artists and bands to play one of their seminal albums live in its entirety. The season started in London in 2005, and has since spread its wings further each year, appearing from 2006 onwards in America and Europe (ATP has hosted stages of Don't Look Back performances at Barcelona's Primavera Sound festival and the Pitchfork Music Festival in Union Park, Chicago), and in 2008 onwards in Australia.

Previous Don't Look Back Seasons
Below is a listing of the years in which each album was first performed as part of the Don't Look Back concept. Some albums have seen repeat performances at later dates, while others, such as Sonic Youth, Slint, and The GZA, went on to tour with the concept. Melvins, inspired by their performance of the album Houdini recorded a CD performing it live entitled A Live History of Gluttony and Lust.

(Info sourced from,)

2005
Belle & Sebastian – If You're Feeling Sinister
Cat Power – The Covers Record
Dinosaur Jr. – You're Living All Over Me
Dirty Three – Ocean Songs
Gang of Four – Entertainment!
Jon Spencer Blues Explosion – Orange
The Lemonheads – It's a Shame About Ray
Melvins – Houdini
Mudhoney – Superfuzz Bigmuff Plus Early Singles
múm – Yesterday Was Dramatic – Today Is OK
Sophia – The Infinite Circle
The Stooges – Fun House

2006
Girls Against Boys – Venus Luxure No.1 Baby
Green on Red – Gas Food Lodging
Isis – Oceanic
Low – Things We Lost in the Fire
John Martyn – Solid Air
Ennio Morricone – Classic Film Soundtracks
Teenage Fanclub – Bandwagonesque
Tindersticks – Tindersticks II
Tortoise – Millions Now Living Will Never Die

2007
Comets on Fire – Blue Cathedral
Cowboy Junkies – The Trinity Session
GZA/Genius – Liquid Swords
The House of Love – The House of Love (1st Creation LP)
Redd Kross – Born Innocent
Slint – Spiderland Amsterdam, Bruxelles, Paris, Bologna, Rome, Barcelona, Glasgow
Sonic Youth – Daydream Nation (Time Out London's Number One Best Gig of 2007)

2008
Died Pretty – Doughboy Hollow
Ed Kuepper – Honey Steel's Gold
The Scientists – Blood Red River
Sebadoh – Bubble & Scrape London, Barcelona, Chicago
Raekwon (with special guest Ghostface Killah) – Only Built 4 Cuban Linx London
Public Enemy – It Takes a Nation of Millions to Hold Us Back London, Manchester, Glasgow, Barcelona, Chicago, Nottingham
Mission of Burma – Vs. Chicago
Meat Puppets – Meat Puppets II New York, London
Thurston Moore – Psychic Hearts New York
Bardo Pond – Lapsed New York
Built to Spill – Perfect from Now On New York, London
Fantômas – The Director's Cut Minehead, London

A repeat performance for 2008 was Tortoise – Millions Now Living Will Never Die in New York.

2009
Dirty Three – Ocean Songs Mount Buller
The Saints – (I'm) Stranded Melbourne & Sydney
X – At Home with You Melbourne
Devo – Q: Are We Not Men? A: We Are Devo! London
Sleep – Holy Mountain Minehead – May
Young Marble Giants – Colossal Youth Minehead – May
Sunn O))) – The Grimmrobe Demos Primavera Sound Festival – May
Suicide – Suicide New York – September
The Feelies – Crazy Rhythms New York – September
The Drones – Wait Long by the River and the Bodies of Your Enemies Will Float By New York – September
Sufjan Stevens – Seven Swans New York – September
Boris – Feedbacker New York – September
Spiritualized – Ladies and Gentlemen We Are Floating in Space London – October
Spiritualized – Ladies and Gentlemen We Are Floating in Space London – December
 Harmony Rockets – Paralyzed Mind Of The Archangel Void Nightmare Before Christmas Festival, England – December
Sunn O))) – The Grimmrobe Demos Ten Years Of ATP Festival, England – December
Yeah Yeah Yeahs – Fever To Tell Ten Years Of ATP Festival, England – December
Papa M – Live from a Shark Cage Ten Years Of ATP Festival, England – December

Repeat performances for 2009 include Dirty Three – Ocean Songs at ATP Australia: Mount Buller, Australia in January and at ATP New York in September.

2010

Dirty Three – Ocean Songs – Melbourne, Sydney, Brisbane, Perth – January
Laughing Clowns – History of Rock n' Roll Part 1 – Melbourne, Sydney, Brisbane – January
Ennio Morricone – performing Classic Film Soundtracks – London – April
The Stooges – Raw Power London – May and New York – September
Suicide – Suicide London – May (supporting The Stooges)
Spiritualized – Ladies and Gentlemen We Are Floating in Space – Minehead, England – May
The Raincoats – The Raincoats London – May
The Scientists – Blood Red River New York – September
 Mudhoney – Superfuzz Bigmuff Plus Early Singles New York – September 
A repeat performance for 2010 was Sleep performing Holy Mountain in New York in September.

2011

Mercury Rev – Deserter's Songs – London, England – May
Meat Puppets – Up On The Sun – Butlins, Minehead – May
The Frogs – It's Only Right And Natural – Butlins, Minehead – May
The Flaming Lips – The Soft Bulletin – London, England – July
Dinosaur Jr – Bug – London, England – July
Deerhoof – Milk Man – London, England – July
Public Enemy – Fear of a Black Planet – I'll Be Your Mirror USA, Asbury Park

A repeat performance for 2011 was Thurston Moore performing Psychic Hearts in London in December.

2012

Robyn Hitchcock – I Often Dream of Trains – Minehead, England – March
Slayer – Reign In Blood – London, England – May
Repeat performances for 2012 include The Raincoats performing their debut LP at the request of Jeff Mangum at Minehead in March.

External links
 Don't Look Back Website
  Don't Look Back Myspace

References

Music festivals in England
Music festivals established in 2005
Concerts